Allan Chibwe (born 22 March 1991) is a Zambian footballer who plays as a goalkeeper for Green Eagles F.C. and the Zambia national football team.

Career

International
Chibwe made his senior international debut on 5 November 2016 in a 1-0 friendly defeat to Zimbabwe.

Career statistics

International

References

External links

1991 births
Living people
Zambian footballers
Zambia international footballers
Association football goalkeepers
Zanaco F.C. players
Power Dynamos F.C. players
Nkana F.C. players
Zambia Super League players
Zambia A' international footballers
2018 African Nations Championship players
Green Eagles F.C. players
2020 African Nations Championship players